Charlwood is a hamlet in the East Hampshire district of Hampshire, England. It is in the large civil parish of Ropley.

The nearest railway station is the restored Ropley railway station on the Watercress Line, trains from which connect with the nearest national rail station  to the northeast, at Alton.

History
Charlwood is first mentioned in 1218 as "Cherlewde". The name means the "Wood of the free peasant" from Old English "ceorl" and "wudu". It is recorded quite consistently throughout the 13th century in conjunction with the Abbott of Titchfield who owned a wood in that Hamlet.

Little remnants of the medieval past of this hamlet are visible, no official archaeological survey has produced any finds from this period in the area. Nearby Lyeway has however produced a great number of medieval potsherds and related archaeology as it was a notable medieval farm in Ropley

Charlwood Farm is the oldest building in the hamlet, with a characteristic 17th/18th Century style to it with later additions, however it is not publicly known whether it has been surveyed or not.

In the 1800s the settlement of the hamlet reached its maximum with about 9 plots visible on the 1880s OS map. A methodist chapel was built to the south likely to serve this growing population in the early 1900s, however its congregation gradually dwindled, and it became derelict and was demolished.

See also
Charlwood (disambiguation)

References

Villages in Hampshire